Edison Eliazer Torres Martínez (born 4 April 1983 in Encarnación) is a Paraguayan footballer currently playing for Talleres de Córdoba from Argentina.

Teams
  Racing Club 2001–2004
  Guaraní 2004–2005
  Universal 2006
  Tacuarembó 2007
  Deportivo Pereira 2008
  Atenas de San Carlos 2009–2010
  Montevideo Wanderers 2010
  Peñarol 2011
  Liverpool de Montevideo 2012–2013
  Cerro Porteño 2013–2014
  Talleres de Córdoba 2014–present

External links
 Profile at BDFA
 

1983 births
Living people
Paraguayan footballers
Paraguayan expatriate footballers
Paraguayan Primera División players
Uruguayan Primera División players
Categoría Primera A players
Racing Club de Avellaneda footballers
Montevideo Wanderers F.C. players
Peñarol players
Club Guaraní players
Deportes Tolima footballers
Liverpool F.C. (Montevideo) players
Atenas de San Carlos players
Tacuarembó F.C. players
Cerro Porteño players
Talleres de Córdoba footballers
Expatriate footballers in Argentina
Expatriate footballers in Colombia
Expatriate footballers in Uruguay
Association footballers not categorized by position